This article presents official statistics gathered during the COVID-19 pandemic in Peru.

Maps

By department 

Note: The Regional Directorate of Health (DIRESA, acronym in Spanish) and the Regional Health Management (GERESA, acronym in Spanish) are health authorities belonging to each regional government (departments) except the province of Lima which is administered by the Ministry of Health, these health authorities have regional autonomy by which show different figures than the reports of the Ministry of Health.

Summary table 

Note: References in the daily report are in the annex, at the beginning of this section.

Charts

Cumulative cases

Nationwide

By region 

 MINSA

 DIRESAs/GERESAs

Daily progress of cases

Positivity 

Daily positivity and test positivity rate, smoothed using the seven-day moving average.

Daily all-cause deaths 

Daily all-cause deaths in Peru based on National System of Deaths data (SINADEF, acronym in Spanish).

Deaths compared to other pandemics in Peru

Severe cases

Offer of hospital and ICU beds 

Hospital and ICU beds availability in Peru as September 11, 2022

Vaccination

Demographics 

Registry of cases and deaths by gender and age based on data from the "Datos Abiertos" platform provided by the Ministry of Health.

Charts

Notes

References 

S
P